Penny Johnson Jerald (born March 14, 1961) is an American actress. She played Beverly Barnes on the HBO comedy series The Larry Sanders Show, Kasidy Yates on the syndicated science fiction series Star Trek: Deep Space Nine, Sherry Palmer on the Fox series 24, Captain Victoria "Iron" Gates on the ABC comedy-drama series Castle, and Dr. Claire Finn on the Fox/Hulu science-fiction series The Orville, and voiced Sarafina in the films The Lion King and Mufasa: The Lion King.

Early life
Penny Johnson was born 14 March 1961 in Baltimore, Maryland, one of seven siblings. Johnson aspired to be an actress as a child. She first attended Western High School before transferring to Park School of Baltimore. Johnson trained at the Juilliard School, where her classmates in 1982 included Megan Gallagher, Jack Kenny, Jack Stehlin, and Lorraine Toussaint.

Career
Jerald began her career with small guest roles. She made her screen debut on an episode of American Playhouse in 1983. Her first major role on television was Vivian Conway in The Paper Chase from 1984 to 1986. She appeared in  General Hospital in 1986 and Do the Right Thing in 1989. She portrayed Virginia "Vicki" Harper on short-lived sitcom Homeroom in 1989. 

In 1992, Jerald landed the role of unflappable personal assistant, Beverly Barnes, on The Larry Sanders Show. For her work on Larry Sanders, Jerald received a CableACE Award nomination for Best Actress in a Comedy Series in 1996. Two years later, she earned an NAACP Image Award nomination in the category of Outstanding Supporting Actress in a Comedy Series. She continued playing Beverly until the show ended in 1998.

Throughout the 1990s, Jerald guest starred in several television series, including Parker Lewis Can't Lose, Star Trek: The Next Generation, Grace Under Fire, Cosby and Family Law. She appeared as Lavinia in television film Class of '61 and portrayed Lorraine in What's Love Got to Do with It? (1993).

Following Larry Sanders, Jerald appeared in Star Trek: Deep Space Nine playing freighter captain Kasidy Yates, the love interest for the series's main character Benjamin Sisko, a recurring role which she played from 1995 to the show's end in 1999. In 1997 she played Laura Simon in the film Absolute Power. She also had a recurring guest role on ER as Lynette Evans from 1998 to 1999. She then appeared as Roscoe Dellums in the Emmy Award-winning TV movie The Color of Friendship. Jerald also guest starred on Frasier, The Practice, Touched by an Angel and The X-Files.

Jerald's most-recognized role came in 2001 when she appeared in the pilot episode of the Kiefer Sutherland-led Fox series, 24, playing Sherry Palmer, the wife of Senator David Palmer. Jerald believed it was the first role to test her acting ability, claiming the majority of her previous characters were "easy-going." She appeared in all but two of the first season episodes and multiple episodes of the second and third seasons. She received a Screen Actors Guild Award nomination for Outstanding Performance by an Ensemble in a Drama Series in 2003 alongside her 24 co-stars.

In 2003, Jerald portrayed Condoleezza Rice in DC 9/11: Time of Crisis, a TV movie about the September 11 attacks in 2001. She reprised the role in the miniseries The Path to 9/11, which aired September 10–11, 2006.

Jerald also guest-starred on the sitcom Eve, playing Shelly's mother Beverly in four episodes. She portrayed Rebecca Parrish in three episodes of sci-fi series The 4400 in 2007. Jerald had a recurring role on ABC midseason drama October Road for the 2007–08 season.

She made guest appearances on episodes of Tyler Perry's House of Payne. Jerald gave voice to Amanda Waller in animated series Justice League: Gods and Monsters Chronicles in 2015.

Jerald joined the cast of ABC's Castle in its fourth season as the new captain of the 12th Precinct, Victoria "Iron" Gates, replacing Ruben Santiago-Hudson's deceased character Roy Montgomery as captain of the precinct. In 2015, Jerald announced on Twitter that she had been let go from the series, and was herself "saddened" and "surprised" by the news. Regarding Jerald's exit from the series, Castle showrunner Alexi Hawley stated it was "very difficult" writing her out of the series.

She was later cast in the role of Dr. Claire Finn in the Fox/Hulu science-fiction series The Orville. In 2019, Jerald provided the voice of Sarafina in The Lion King, a remake of the 1994 film.

Personal life
She married Gralin Jerald in 1983. Jerald also teaches acting workshops and produces and directs for Outreach Christian Theater Company, which she and her musician husband  founded in 1994. The couple have a daughter.

Filmography

Film

Television

References

External links

 
 

1961 births
Living people
20th-century African-American people
20th-century African-American women
21st-century African-American people
21st-century African-American women
African-American actresses
American Christians
American film actresses
American television actresses
American voice actresses
Juilliard School alumni
Actresses from Baltimore
Park School of Baltimore alumni